Iwi are the largest social units in New Zealand Māori society. 

Iwi or IWI may also refer to:

Israel Weapon Industries, an Israeli arms manufacturer often abbreviated to IWI
ʻIʻiwi, a bird species
 Edward Iwi (1904–1966), English lawyer
 Iwi, a fictional people inhabiting Skull Island in Kong: Skull Island